Fowler-Loomis House is a historic home located at Mexico in Oswego County, New York.  It is a large, square, -story wood-frame house in the Greek Revival style.  The residence was built in 1847 and is a full five bays in width with a low-rise hipped roof.  It features a full-length, 2-story portico supported by four massive square columns.

It was listed on the National Register of Historic Places in 1991.

References

Houses on the National Register of Historic Places in New York (state)
Houses completed in 1847
Houses in Oswego County, New York
1847 establishments in New York (state)
National Register of Historic Places in Oswego County, New York